Samaje Perine (born September 16, 1995) is an American football running back for the Denver Broncos of the National Football League (NFL). He played college football at Oklahoma, and was drafted by the Washington Redskins in the fourth round of the 2017 NFL Draft.

Perine currently holds the NCAA FBS record for most rushing yards in a single game, which he set as a true freshman in 2014 by rushing for 427 yards against Kansas.

Early years
Perine was born and raised in Jackson, Alabama, but later moved with his family to Pflugerville, Texas, where he attended Hendrickson High School as a member of their football and track and field teams. He was a three-year starter at running back for the Hendrickson Hawks football team. He rushed for 1,993 yards and 16 touchdowns as a junior. In his final year, he rushed for 1,492 yards and 12 touchdowns.

In track & field, Perine competed in sprints and jumps. At the 2011 Manor Relay, he earned first-place finishes in both the triple jump (46 ft, 0.5 in) and long jump (20 ft, 8 in) events, while also anchoring the 4 × 100 and 4 × 200 relay squads, helping lead them to victory. He recorded a personal-best time of 11.37 seconds in the 100-meter dash in 2011.

Perine was ranked as a four-star recruit and the No. 13 running back in the nation by Rivals.com. In March 2013, he committed to the University of Oklahoma to play college football. He also had offers from Alabama, Nebraska, TCU, and Tennessee.

College career
Perine attended and played college football for the University of Oklahoma from 2014–2016.

2014 season
Perine saw immediate playing time as a freshman at Oklahoma in 2014. In his first career game, he rushed for 77 yards on 13 carries with one touchdown in a victory over Louisiana Tech. In his fourth game, he rushed 242 yards on 34 carries with four touchdowns. He rushed for 200 yards a second time, gaining 213 on 25 carries along with three touchdowns against Texas Tech on November 15. Perine rushed for 427 yards on 34 rushes along with six touchdowns in a victory over Kansas, breaking the NCAA FBS single game rushing record set by Wisconsin's Melvin Gordon just a week earlier. He finished his freshman season with 1,713 rushing yards on 263 carries with 21 touchdowns.

2015 season
Perine started the 2015 season with 33 rushing yards and a rushing touchdown in a victory over the Akron Zips. In the next game, a 2OT win over the #23 Tennessee Volunteers at Neyland Stadium, he had 78 rushing yards and a receiving touchdown. In the following game against Tulsa, he had 152 rushing yards and a rushing touchdown. On October 24, against Texas Tech, he had a season-high 201 rushing yards and four rushing touchdowns. He followed that up with 90 rushing yards and two rushing touchdowns against Kansas in the next game. On November 14, against Baylor, he had 166 rushing yards and two rushing touchdowns. He followed that performance up with 188 rushing yards and a rushing touchdown against TCU. In the annual rivalry game against Oklahoma State, he had 131 rushing yards and two rushing touchdowns. Oklahoma qualified for the College Football Playoff in the 2015 season. They faced off against Clemson in the National Semifinals. In the 37–17 loss in the Orange Bowl, he had 58 rushing yards, one rushing touchdown, two receptions, and 23 receiving yards. Overall, in the 2015 season, he finished with 1,349 rushing yards, 16 rushing touchdowns, 15 receptions, 107 receiving yards, and one receiving touchdown.

2016 season
On October 1, in a win over TCU, Perine had 214 rushing yards and two rushing touchdowns. On November 12, against Baylor, he had 100 rushing yards and two rushing touchdowns. In the following game at West Virginia, he had 160 rushing yards and two rushing touchdowns. On December 3, he had 239 rushing yards and a touchdown against Oklahoma State. He broke the school career rushing yard record on January 2, 2017, with 86 rushing yards and a touchdown against Auburn at the Allstate Sugar Bowl passing Billy Sims with a total of 4,122 yards. He finished the 2016 season with 1,060 rushing yards, 12 rushing touchdowns, 10 receptions, 106 receiving yards, and one receiving touchdown. After the season, Perine decided to forgo his senior year and enter the 2017 NFL Draft.

Statistics

Professional career

Washington Redskins

The Washington Redskins selected Perine in the fourth round (114th overall) of the 2017 NFL Draft. He was the ninth running back selected in that year's draft.  On May 11, 2017, Perine signed a four-year, $3.05 million contract with the team.

Perine joined a committee backfield of Chris Thompson, Robert Kelley, and Mack Brown. After the two starters combined for 34 yards in Week 1, Perine debuted September 17 against the Los Angeles Rams with 21 rushes for 67 yards. Despite being granted the majority of the team's rushes, he had fewer yards than either Thompson (78) or Kelley (77). In Week 3 against the Oakland Raiders, he again led the team in carries with 19 but for only 49 yards, and was moved back into a supporting role. Perine collected just 59 rushing yards total in Weeks 4–9, though he did pick up his first career touchdown on a three-yard reception from Kirk Cousins against San Francisco in Week 6.

After nine rushes for 35 yards and a 25-yard reception in Week 9, Perine moved back to starting following injuries to both Thompson and Kelley. He had success in Week 10 with 23 rushes for 117 yards, as well as his first career rushing touchdown against the New Orleans Saints, marking the first 100-yard rushing game for the Redskins of the season. He followed this up the following week with 24 rushes for 100 yards against the New York Giants, marking first Redskin with consecutive yard games of over 100 yards since Alfred Morris in 2013. Overall, he finished his rookie season with 603 rushing yards and one rushing touchdown to go along with 22 receptions for 182 yards and a receiving touchdown.

In a backfield where new arrival Adrian Peterson recorded most of the carries, Perine had eight carries for 32 yards in five games in the 2018 season. Perine was waived prior to the 2019 regular season on August 31.

Cincinnati Bengals
On September 1, 2019, Perine was claimed off waivers by the Cincinnati Bengals. He was waived on October 17, 2019, but re-signed to the team's practice squad the following day.

Miami Dolphins
On December 24, 2019, Perine was signed by the Miami Dolphins off the Bengals practice squad. He was waived on April 26, 2020.

Cincinnati Bengals (second stint)
On April 28, 2020, Perine was claimed off waivers by the Cincinnati Bengals. In Week 8 of the 2020 season, against the Tennessee Titans, he scored his first touchdown since Week 11 of the 2017 season. In Week 16, against the Houston Texans, he had 13 carries for 95 rushing yards and two rushing touchdowns in the 37–31 victory. Perine finished the season with 63 rushes for 301 yards and three touchdowns, averaging 4.8 yards per carry. He re-signed on a two-year contract with the Bengals on March 24, 2021.

In the 2021 season, Perine had a backup role to former Oklahoma teammate Joe Mixon. He finished with 55 carries for 246 rushing yards and one rushing touchdown to go along with 27 receptions for 196 receiving yards and one receiving touchdown. In the AFC Championship against the Kansas City Chiefs, he had a 41-yard touchdown reception from Joe Burrow in the second quarter. The Bengals were down 21–3 at the time of the touchdown and it helped begin a comeback victory.

The 2022 season followed with Perine continuing to back up Mixon, though after he sustained a concussion during the Week 11 game against the Pittsburgh Steelers, Perine would fill in as starter for the next two weeks. He finished with 394 rushing yards and 2 rushing touchdowns, and a career high 287 receiving yards and 4 receiving touchdowns.

Denver Broncos
On March 16, 2023, the Denver Broncos signed Perine to a two-year contract.

NFL career statistics

Personal life
During his time in high school and Oklahoma, Perine was noted for his acts of great physical strength, such as helping lift a car to help a fellow student who did not have a car jack change a flat tire. Jerry Schmidt, strength coach of the Sooners, stated that he could often out bench press most of the team's lineman, with his max being 440 lbs. Schmidt also noted that nobody else on the team was able to top Perine's max squat (540 lbs), power clean (380 lbs), or incline bench (315 lbs) numbers.

Perine's cousin, La'Mical Perine, played running back for the Florida Gators and was drafted by the New York Jets in 2020.

References

External links
Cincinnati Bengals bio
Oklahoma Sooners bio

1995 births
Living people
People from Pflugerville, Texas
Players of American football from Alabama
Players of American football from Texas
American football running backs
Oklahoma Sooners football players
Washington Redskins players
Cincinnati Bengals players
Miami Dolphins players
African-American players of American football
People from Jackson, Alabama
21st-century African-American sportspeople
Denver Broncos players